Tosin Kehinde (born 18 June 1998) is a Nigerian professional footballer who plays for Danish Superliga club Randers FC as a winger.

Early and personal life
Kehinde was born in Lagos, Nigeria and grew up in the United Kingdom.

Club career
Kehinde joined the Manchester United Academy at the age of 13. His contract expired in June 2018, and he was linked with a transfer to a number of clubs across Europe as well as in England.

He was offered a new contract by Manchester United, but signed for Portuguese club Feirense in August 2018. He moved on loan to Danish club Randers FC in July 2019. He made his debut against OB. On 24 August 2020 Randers FC confirmed that Kehinde had signed permanently on a deal until June 2023.

International career
Kehinde is eligible to represent either Nigeria or England at international level, and in March 2018 he announced his intention to represent Nigeria.

Honours
Randers
Danish Cup: 2020–21

References

1998 births
Living people
Nigerian footballers
English footballers
Danish Superliga players
Manchester United F.C. players
C.D. Feirense players
Randers FC players
Association football wingers
Nigerian expatriate footballers
Nigerian expatriate sportspeople in England
Expatriate footballers in England
Nigerian expatriate sportspeople in Portugal
Expatriate footballers in Portugal
Nigerian expatriate sportspeople in Denmark
Expatriate men's footballers in Denmark